Greek is a verse play by Steven Berkoff. It was first performed at The Half Moon Theatre, London  on 11 February 1980.

It is a retelling of Sophocles' Oedipus Rex. Berkoff wrote: "Greek came to me via Sophocles, trickling its way down the millennia until it reached the unimaginable wastelands of Tufnell Park ... In my eyes, Britain seemed to have become a gradually decaying island, preyed upon by the wandering hordes who saw no future for themselves in a society which had few ideals or messages to offer them."

Notable productions

World premiere

11 February 1980 at the Half Moon Theatre, London.Directed by Steven Berkoff. 
 Eddy & Fortune-teller - Barry Philips
 Dad & Manager of cafe - Matthew Scurfield
 Wife, Doreen & Waitress 1 - Linda Marlowe
 Mum, Sphinx & Waitress 2 - Janet Amsden

The production transferred in September 1980 to the Arts Theatre Club, with Deirdre Morris replacing Janet Amsden.

1988 London revival

29 June 1988 at the Wyndham's Theatre, London.Directed by Steven Berkoff.  
 Eddy & Fortune-teller - Bruce Payne
 Dad & Manager of cafe - Steven Berkoff
 Wife, Doreen & Waitress 1 - Gillian Eaton 
 Mum, Sphinx & Waitress 2 - Georgia Brown

Opera adaptation

The play was used as the basis for a well-received opera of the same name composed by Mark-Anthony Turnage and first performed in 1988.

Further reading

References

External links
Greek webpage on the Half Moon Stages website

Plays by Steven Berkoff
1980 plays
Plays based on ancient Greek and Roman plays
Works based on Oedipus Rex
Plays adapted into operas
Plays set in London
Plays based on works by Sophocles
Modern adaptations of works by Sophocles